Nawab Bahadur Yar Jung (also Bahadur Yar Jang; 3 February 1905 – 25 June 1944) was an Indian politician and foremost Muslim leader in the princely state of Hyderabad in British India. He founded All India Majlis-e-Ittehadul Muslimeen and  the branches of Khaksars in Hyderabad and was known as a powerful religious preacher. In 1938, he was elected the President of Majlis-e-Ittehadul Muslimeen, a position in which he served till his death.

Career

Bahadur Yar Jung wanted his own princely home state, Hyderabad, to be separate from the rest of India as an Islamic/Muslim state with Sharia Law in force. He was the founder and led an organisation called Majlis-e-Ittehadul Muslimeen, for the propagation of Islam. A friend and aid to Mohammed Iqbal and Muhammad Ali Jinnah, he was one of the most admired leaders of the Pakistan Movement. In 1926, Bahadur Yar Jung was elected president of the Society of Mahdavis. In 1927, he led an organisation called Majlis-e-Ittehadul Muslimeen, of which he was the founder member. In 1930, he was elected secretary of the Union of Jagirdars which had been established in 1892 but was moribund. A great Muslim zealot, he advocated peaceful but separate and  independent co-existence among people of different religions after the independence of British India. So he vigorously supported All India Muslim League and the Pakistan Movement. He was closely associated with both Allama Iqbal and Muhammad Ali Jinnah. He was an author and a practising Muslim.

Oratory
Matched by very few, his oratory skills served as a catalyst to the independence struggle of British India. On 26 December 1943, he delivered an important speech in the All India Muslim League Conference. In the first half of his speech he laid stress on the struggle for Pakistan. In the second half he talked about the creation of Pakistan. At the end he said,
"Muslims! Decisions made under pressure do not last for long. To-day we are not in need of a tree that blooms like a flower or in need of fruit that tastes sweet to our mouths. Instead, we are in the need of fine manure that dissolves in the soil and strengthens the roots. That will unite with the water and soil to produce beautiful flowers. That will destroy itself but will leave its scent and taste in the flowers. We are at present not in need of beautiful scenery that looks good to the eyes, but what we need are foundation stones that will bury themselves in the soil to make the building standing on them strong."

Syed al Maududi and the Nawab
Maududi's first encounter with Bahadur Yar Jang was at the Hyderabad Educational Conference in 1929. Maududi said about him:"When I listened to his speech on this occasion, I was not even aware of his name. Before too long in the course of his speech, I realized that I am facing a man different from the ordinary speakers. His organized thoughts, coherent statements, choice of appropriate words and their well-timed use peppered with good literary taste combined to impress me immediately. Upon asking around in the audience I was told that this was Navab Bahadur Khan, a jagirdar (landholder). On hearing his class background, I was even more impressed. Knowing the feudal class of Hyderabad, I did not expect such a great speaker with pure thoughts and wide knowledge to emerge from that class".Despite this Maududi disassociated himself from the Nawab's Majlis e Ittehad as he found "no benefit in their method of work" and was also critical of him saying that:"There definitely are some good qualities in Bahadur Yar Jang, but his mind is not clear yet. He [sometimes] raises the voice of the caliphate of God, [sometimes] he is with the Khaksars and the Muslim League. Sometimes he is involved in Haydarabadi non-Haydarabadi disputes".Bahadur Yar Jang wrote a letter in 1938, expressing his appreciation for Mawdudi's activities and regretted that Mawdudi did not bid him farewell before the latter's departure to Punjab.

Personal life
He was the son of Nawab Naseeb Yar Jung, a prominent resident of Hyderabad. His wife's name was Talmain Khatoon. He had two brothers by name Nawab Mohammed Mandoor Khan Sadozai and Nawab Mohammed Doulath Khan Sadozai. Nawab Mohammed Mandoor Khan’s three sons (Nawab Mohammed Naseeb Khan, Nawab Mohammed Bahadur Khan & Nawab Mohammed Adil Khan). His Grandson Nawab Mohammad Moazam Khan s/o Nawab Mohammed Naseeb khan is an Bahadurpura constituency MLA since 2004-today from AIMIM party which was founded by Nawab Bahadur Yar Jung.

Commemorations
Bahadurabad, a neighbourhood of Karachi, Sindh, Pakistan, is named after Bahadur Yar Jung.
City of Karachi, Pakistan also has Bahadur Yar Jung Library and Bahadur Yar Jung Academy named after him.
In 1990, Pakistan Post issued a postage stamp depicting him in its 'Pioneers of Freedom' series designed by Saeed Akhtar.

See also

Hyderabad State
Muslim League
Majlis-e-Ittehadul Muslimeen
Pakistan Movement
Pashtun people

References

Bibliography

External links
 Biography of Bahadur Yar Jung
When the Nizam Wept
 Hyderabad 1948 Revisited — Was Kashmir A Mistake? by India Defence Consultants (archived 31 March 2005)
 An English translation of Saadat Hasan Manto's 'Mera Sahib' (archived 19 February 2006)

Yar Jung, Bahadur
Yar Jung, Bahadur
Yar Jung, Bahadur
Salar Jung family
Yar Jung, Bahadur
All India Majlis-e-Ittehadul Muslimeen politicians
20th-century Indian politicians
20th-century Indian Muslims
Indian Muslim activists